Puspanathan Wilson (born 6 June 1966) is a Senior Advocate in India and has served as the Additional Solicitor General of India between August 2012 and May 2014   and  the Additional Advocate General of the State of Tamil Nadu between August 2008 and May 2011.

He is a member of the Rajya Sabha, the upper house of the Parliament of India from Tamil Nadu as a member of the DMK. He was the DMK lawyer in the case for securing burial space on Marina Beach for M Karunanidhi.

Background and education
Wilson was born in Chennai, Tamil Nadu and completed his schooling at Asan Memorial Higher Secondary School. He obtained a bachelor's degree in Science from Loyola College, Chennai and completed his Bachelor of Laws from Madras Law College. He was enrolled as an advocate with the Bar Council of Tamil Nadu in the year 1989.

Early practice
Wilson joined the Chambers of Shri K.V. Venkatapathi, a former Advocate General of Tamil Nadu after his enrollment. He soon set up his individual practice in the civil side before the Madras High Court. He was appointed as the Standing Counsel for the Corporation of Chennai in the year 1996 and the Tamil Nadu Civil Supplies Corporation in the year 1998. He was also made Standing Counsel for the Tamil Nadu State Transport Corporation in the year 1998. In the year 2002 he was appointed as Additional Central Government Standing Counsel and he served for about 3 years in the said post.

Subsequent appointments
Wilson was appointed as the Senior Central Government Standing Counsel in the Madras High Court in the year 2005. He was subsequently appointed as the Special Government Pleader (Writs) by the Government of Tamil Nadu in June 2006. Barely two months later, he was appointed as the Assistant Solicitor General, Madras High Court in August 2006.

In August 2008, the Government of Tamil Nadu appointed Wilson to the post of the Additional Advocate General of Tamil Nadu from which he resigned in May 2011 along with the other law officers in the State.

Senior Advocate
Wilson was designated as a Senior Advocate by the Madras High Court in November 2009 at the age of 43. He has appeared in important Constitutional matters and other matters in the civil and commercial sides before the Madras High Court.

Appointment as Additional Solicitor General of India
Wilson was appointed as the Additional Solicitor General (South India) in August 2012 by the Government of India for the High Courts of Madras, Kerala, Karnataka and Andhra Pradesh and their benches. Wilson is the youngest Additional Solicitor General of South India. Wilson resigned as ASGI (South India) in May 2014 after the change in the Union Government.

Election as a Rajya Sabha Member

Mr Wilson was nominated to Rajya Sabha (Upper House) on behalf of the DMK Party by its Party president M.K. Stalin. His work in the Court was appreciated and recognised by the DMK Party and by its Leader Mr M.K. Stalin.

M. K. Stalin in one of his messages to his party cadres wrote "Mr Wilson was always in the heart of Dr Kalaignar. He was instrumental in fighting in the Court to get land for Kalaignar's Mortal remains after his demise inside Arignar Anna Samathi thereby he (Wilson) changed all our sad tears into tears of joy in a second".

Mr Wilson filed his nomination for election as a member of Rajya Sabha and was elected unopposed on 11.09.2019. He took his oath in the Rajya Sabha on 25.07.2019. He has been successfully defending the interests of the people of Tamil Nadu at the Rajya Sabha. He has spoken on many bills which were introduced in the Rajya Sabha. In one of his speeches on special mention before Rajya Sabha he has emphasised the need to increase in the retirement age of judges of High Courts from 62 to 65.

Cases
Wilson has successfully defended the Government of India and the Government of Tamil Nadu in several sensitive cases during his tenure. He successfully defended the Government of Tamil Nadu's Samacheer Kalvi system of Uniform School Education before the Madras High Court as well as the Supreme Court of India. He also successfully defended the landmark legislation of the Tamil Nadu Government to fix uniform fees in all schools in the State. He has appeared and defended the National Highways Authority of India in several matters pertaining to large infrastructural projects.

As a Senior Advocate before the Madras High Court, Wilson has appeared in several cases of immense public importance. A few of them are:

1. The Public Interest Litigation (PIL) challenging the move of the State Government to convert the multi-crore Secretariat Building at Omandurar Government Estate into a Multi-Speciality Hospital.

2. The PIL challenging the decision of the State Government to shift the Anna Centenary Library out of its world class building on political considerations. The Hon'ble Madras High Court has stayed the proposed conversion in 2011. Subsequently in 2015, the Hon'ble Madras High Court quashed the state's move to shift and issued a series of directives such as filling staff vacancies, maintaining the complex and purchase of books and magazines. This is one of the rarest case wherein the Hon'ble First Bench is issuing continuing mandamus from time to time to see that the World class Anna Centenary Library is restored back to its original position and is upgraded with all latest books.

3. The Constitutional Challenge to the setting up of Special Cells and Special Courts by the State Government to try a class of offences called "land grabbing". The First Bench of the Madras High Court quashed the Government Orders setting up these Courts and Special Cells.

4. He fought for the retrenched 13000 Makkal Nala Paniyalargal who were dismissed by the Tamil Nadu state government due to political vendetta, and the division bench of Madras High court directed the State Government to absorb the 13000 retrenched employees in various posts of government on or before 31 October 2014 otherwise they should be paid their last drawn salary till appointment.

5. He was instrumental in getting direction against the Election Commission to have webcasting of all the booths during the conduct of corporation election in 2011.

6. He appeared in the case filed by T.K.S.Elangovan, Member of Parliament challenging the appointment of eleven public service commission members wherein the Madras High Court in a path breaking judgment quashed their appointments.

7. He was successful in transferring the investigation relating to alleged suicide of R.Vishnupriya the then DSP of Tiruchengode from the CBCID to the Central Bureau of Investigation (CBI). The subsequent appeal by the State government to Supreme Court was dismissed after hearing his arguments.

8. He prevented the closure of schools when the Tamil Nadu state government decided to do so after the conviction and imprisonment of Ms.J.Jayalalitha the then Chief Minister of Tamil Nadu in disproportionate asset case.

9. He appeared in a case where the High Court directed the Mayor of Vellore Municipal Corporation to tender apology when a resolution was passed condemning special judge Kunha for passing verdict against Ms.J.Jayalaitha in disproportionate asset case.

10. The effort to stop Trichy-Karaikudi(NH 210) NHAI Road Project was challenged before the Madras High Court by NHAI and he was successful in getting the interim injunction restraining the State Government from interfering with laying of roads by NHAI. The High Court subsequently held that the project being of public importance and state action to stop the Road Project is against public interest besides being irrational, thereby allowing NHAI to complete the project.

11. He was successful in quashing the Election Commission’s notification relating to holding of local body elections in the state which was slated to be conducted in 2016 before the Madras High Court. He was successful in arguing the appeal preferred by the state Election Commission and the Hon’ble First Bench of Madras High Court gave direction to conduct fresh election before 17 November 2017.

12. He along with Advocate K.Balu sought to stall any move by the Tamil Nadu State Government to circumvent the Supreme Court order upholding a ban on liquor vends within 500m of National and State Highways. The High Court restrained the State Government from opening any TASMAC liquor shops for the subsequent three months.

13. Gutka is classified as chewable tobacco causes cancer, heart attack and kidney failure when consumed. About 15% of population in Tamilnadu are addicted to this chewable tobacco and younger generation heath and financial status gets spoiled due to this addiction. The said chewable tobacco was sold in soil of Tamilnadu freely despite orders of Supreme Court and Ban issued by Government of Tamilnadu due to the high collusion and nexus between Gutka Mafia manufacturer's with State Minister,High Police officials, State and Central Government officials. Mr Wilson was successful in appearing and arguing before Hon'ble First Bench consisting of Hon'ble Chief Justice Ms Indira Banerjee and Hon'ble Mr Justice Abdul Quddhose and getting the investigation transferred to CBI from State Police. In a remarkable and path breaking Judgement the Madras High Court held the right to health is a constitutional right and it is duty of state to protect its citizens from the evils of chewable tobacco which spoils the younger generations.

14. When Dr Kalaignar the 5 time Chief Minister of Tamil Nadu and President of DMK party passed away on 7.8.2018 and when request from family members and DMK Party to bury the mortals of Late leader at Arignar Anna Samathi was refused by the Tamilnadu Government, he moved a Writ petition on same day late evening at the Judges residence seeking for a decent burial at Anna Samathi. The matter was heard by the Hon'ble first Bench which commenced at late night on 7.8.2018 and ended around 2.30 Am on 8.8.2018 and again resumed at 8 Am and concluded at 12 noon on 8.8.2018. Mr Wilson was successful in getting the land allotted at Marina next to Anna Samathi.

He has also appeared in several high profile cases that were widely covered by the media such as the Vishwaroopam case, and the PIL against conferring of the Bharat Ratna to Sachin Tendulkar

References

1966 births
Living people
20th-century Indian lawyers
Rajya Sabha members from Tamil Nadu